The Palacio del Marqués de Casa Riera was the name for two successive buildings located in the same place, in the Spanish city of Madrid, in the number 64 of the Calle de Alcalá, it was in the widest part of the street.

First palace

Its plant formed a rectangle parallelogram, consisting each of its four facades of three floors that were in all them in the same horizontal plan, serving as entrance to the building a spacious garden, which occupied the site of the old Convento de la Natividad y San José
 A portal with three entries, ornate with pillars, separated this garden from the Calle de Alcalá.

The building dates from early 19th century. It was built as a dowry for the Duchess of Abrantes, for which circumstance was designated with the name of "la casa de los alfileres" (the house of the pins).  In the new building lived the Marquis of Ariza, the Russian ambassador, Prince Tatischef, and the famous provisionist of the French army and great financial Gabriel-Julien Ouvrard, in 1823 and 1824, at which time were held on its halls magnificent soirees and banquets, until it acquired the Catalan Marquis of Riera, who invested large sums in the decoration. The extension of the house and gardens was considerable, besides providing in front, on calle del Turco, other big housing for garages and offices, with which had connexion through a tunnel.

Second palace

On 1893 the first palace was demolished, and the Marquis of Casa Riera's nephew, Alejandro Riera Mora rose another palace. The new building was designed by architect Rodriguez Avial, in stone walls, brick and slate with attic. Part of the large garden is acquired to work in the Círculo de Bellas Artes (Circle of Fine Arts of Antonio Palacios) in 1917 and the rest was demolished in the late-1920s.

Remains
After the Spanish Civil War the site of the palace is occupied by a building that would be the Secretaría General del Movimiento (General Secretariat of the Movement) until 1977 and whose facade facing calle de Alcalá highlighted the yoke and arrows of great size that was its symbol. The garden was then used as parking. Then passed to the current office building of the Calle Alcalá No. 44, which can also be accessed through the garden from the calle Marqués Casa Riera. The office building reflects a simple structure, elegant and modern, with stone, marble and metals. Inside are touches of greenery and water, as continuation of the original gardens as well as a fountain of contemporary design in the center of the courtyard.

At the low facing the calle Alcalá is located the Catalan cultural center and library, called Blanquerna, as a tribute to the Catalan origins of the Marquis which gives his name to the street.

Notes

References 

Demolished buildings and structures in Madrid
Buildings and structures demolished in 1893
Buildings and structures completed in the 19th century
Renaissance Revival architecture in Spain
Former palaces in Spain
Calle de Alcalá
1920s disestablishments in Spain
Buildings and structures demolished in the 1920s